Sundby Idrætspark is a sports complex, that consists of a combined association football and athletics stadium, located in the district of Amager Vest, Copenhagen. It has been the home ground of the association football clubs BK Fremad Amager and B 1908 since its auguration in September 1922, and have previously hosted BK Standard (1923–1946) and the professional superstructure FC Amager (2008–2009). As of May 2019, the total capacity of approximately 7,200 spectators, with 2,500 seatings at the main grand stand stretching along one side of the pitch, makes the exhibition field among the 25th largest football stadiums in Denmark. The track of the exhibition venue has consisted of artificial turf since August 2018, where it replaced natural grass. In 2018, floodlights of 1,000 lux were installed at the exhibition field, so it was possible to show televised matches from the Danish Superliga.

The stadium hosted the preliminary rounds of the 2015 World Archery Championships.

History
The stadium was inaugurated on 10 September 1922 with an association football match between the two then best ranking Amager-based teams, BK Fremad Amager and B 1908 in front of a sizeable crowd — a silver trophy donated by wholesaler O. P. Jansen for the occasion was won by B 1908. At the inauguration in September 1922, the sport's facility, with the entrance located at Englandsvej, consisted of 5 football fields, with one of these fields being specifically fenced and designated for tournament matches. The first match was played at one of the smaller fields rather than the main field, because it was not ready for use. An actual exhibition field was inaugurated with an association football match on 26 April 1925 between a representative team for island of Amager and B 1903. The sports complex now consisted of an exhibition field and four football fields.

Facilities
The grand stand houses dressing rooms and press facilities. On the opposite side of the main stand there is a wooden terrace nicknamed as the Sunny Side. There are also a couple of smaller terraces at one end of the ground.

References

External links
 Official website for Sundby Idrætspark at the Copenhagen Municipality 

Athletics (track and field) venues in Denmark
Football venues in Denmark
Fremad Amager
Boldklubben 1908
Archery venues
Sports venues in Copenhagen